Dick Cole (born 6 April 1967) is a Cornish politician, currently serving as an elected member of Cornwall Council and the leader of the Cornish devolutionist political party, Mebyon Kernow, a role he has held since 1997. He is currently one of the longest serving political leaders in Britain. Dick Cole was first elected MK leader in 1997. He lives in Fraddon, a village in Mid-Cornwall.

Early life
Cole grew up in Cornwall on the edge of the Goss Moor and was educated at Treviglas School, Newquay and University of Wales, Lampeter.

Political career
Before becoming party leader in 1997, Cole had been Mebyon Kernow's press officer for the previous five years. Previous to that he had also campaigned for Plaid Cymru whilst at University in Wales.

In 1999, he was elected as a member of the borough council of Restormel, representing St Enoder, retaining his seat until the council was abolished as part of the 2009 structural changes.

In the 2005 general election, he stood for parliament in North Cornwall and gained 1351 votes, coming fifth of six candidates standing.

In 2009, a new unitary authority called Cornwall Council was formed. On 4 June 2009, Cole contested both the local and European Parliament elections held in Cornwall on that day. In the European Parliament election, he headed the Mebyon Kernow party list for the South West England constituency. In the Cornwall Council election held on the same day, he fought the St Enoder electoral division, achieving a 78 per cent of the vote, comfortably beating the Conservative and Lib Dem candidates into second and third places respectively.

In 2010 Cole was Mebyon Kernow's prospective parliamentary candidate for the newly formed St Austell and Newquay constituency in the United Kingdom general election. He gained 2,007 votes (4.2% of votes cast), placing him in fourth position.

In 2015 Cole again stood as Mebyon Kernow's parliamentary candidate for the St Austell and Newquay constituency in the United Kingdom general election. He gained 2,063 votes (4.1% of votes cast) placing him in last position (out of 6 candidates). Although he increased his vote total, his percentage of the votes cast declined by 0.2%.

He lives in Fraddon, in Mid-Cornwall, where he is a member of St Enoder parish council, a governor of Summercourt Primary School, and a trustee of the Fraddon Millennium Green and the Indian Queens Pit.

In Cornwall Council, Cole leads the Mebyon Kernow political group, chairs the Planning Policy Advisory Panel, and represents the council in the Local Government Association's County Councils Network Special Interest Group. 

He has been outspoken on issues regarding the incinerator in St Dennis and the plans to build thousands of new homes through the development of an eco-town. He has also led a delegation to 10 Downing Street to present 50,000 signatures from Cornwall in support of calls for a referendum on the creation of a Cornish Assembly.

Publications
Mebyon Kernow and Cornish nationalism (with Bernard Deacon and Garry Tregidga) (Cardiff: Welsh Academic Press, 2003)

References

External links

 Dick Cole's blog

1968 births
Living people
Restormel
Archaeologists from Cornwall
Alumni of the University of Wales, Lampeter
Mebyon Kernow politicians
Members of Cornwall Council
Leaders of political parties in the United Kingdom
21st-century English politicians
20th-century English politicians
Bards of Gorsedh Kernow